The Salagou Formation is a geologic formation in France. It preserves fossils dating back to the Permian period.

Geology 
The Salagou Formation is a fine-grained loessite which is a deposit of red mudstone. It was created by the Montage Noire Dome.

Discoveries 
In 2015, a number of new insects were discovered in the Salagou Formation including Paleomanteidae and reclassification of Permobaharellus salagousensis, Lodevophlebia reticulata (Sylvaphlebiidae), and Oborella lodevensis (Euryptilonidae) based on found wing patterns.

See also

 List of fossiliferous stratigraphic units in France

References

https://www.google.com/books/edition/Multi_Disciplinary_Applications_in_Magne/pGEhEAAAQBAJ?hl=en&gbpv=1&dq=Salagou+Formation&pg=PA116&printsec=frontcover

Permian France